TXT e-solutions is an international software development and consulting company.
Founded in 1989, TXT e-solutions has been listed since July 2000 on Borsa Italiana–London Stock Exchange (TXT.MI) STAR segment. The company has headquarters in Milan with offices in Italy, France, UK, Germany, Switzerland and the United States.

Overview 
TXT operates across Aerospace, Aviation, Defense, Industrial, Government and Fintech. TXT is headquartered in Milan and has subsidiaries in Italy, Germany, the United Kingdom, France, Switzerland and the United States. The holding company TXT e-solutions S.p.A, has been listed on the Italian Stock Exchange, STAR segment (TXT.MI), since July 2000.

Another focus of TXT e-solutions is Research & Development. Its Corporate Research team is involved in several national (Italian) and international research programs.

History 
TXT e-solution was founded in the 1989. During the 1090s, it released software products dedicated to Production Planning & Scheduling and then its first Software Suite for (SCM) Supply Chain Management. Soon after its IPO in 2000, it started international operations and started up subsidiaries in France, Spain, United Kingdom and Germany.  In 2002, 
TXT e-solutions released its first solutions for Supply Chain Management specialized by Business Processes: Demand Management and Sales and Operations Planning. The year after, it released its new Software Products for Product Data Management (PDM). TXT Polymedia, (former subsidiary of TXT e-solutions), which began in the late 1990s with Multichannel Content Management software, and extended its offering to Digital Terrestrial Television.

In 2004, TXT PERFORM Software products for Demand & Supply Chain Management and Sales & Operation Planning was released, as well as a new Polymedia Mobile Platform. In 2006, Microsoft selected TXT e-solutions for the Industry Builder Initiative to cover Supply Chain Planning needs of consumer-driven industries. The year after, competence areas and line of businesses were grouped into three divisions: TXT PERFORM, TXT POLYMEDIA, and TXT NEXT.

In 2008, there were two important releases for the company: first TXTPERFORM2008 (the new Supply Chain Planning Suite combining Business Intelligence functionalities with Supply Chain Planning), and then Media in a Box (multimedia content management platform).

TXT e-solutions then launched a new Software product for Product Lifecycle Management by TXT PERFORM and new service line for Digital Manufacturing dedicated to Aerospace sector by TXT NEXT.

In 2011, TXT e-solutions focused its development strategy on the TXT PERFORM and TXT NEXT divisions. That year, TXT Polymedia business was sold to Kit Digital Inc. to secure additional financing and to accelerate its international growth.

On 2 October 2017, TXT group finalized the sale of the TXT Retail (TXT PERFORM) division to Aptos, Inc. (formerly a division of Epicor).

See also 
 Product lifecycle management
 Supply Chain Management

References 

Software companies of Italy
Business software companies
Development software companies
Supply chain software companies
Companies based in Milan
Software companies established in 1989
Companies listed on the Borsa Italiana